Gerard Vincent Toohey (born 22 October 1966) is a former Australian rules footballer who played with Geelong in the Victorian Football League (VFL).

Toohey, a recruit from Barooga, made his only senior VFL appearance for Geelong in the 1985 VFL season. He was one of five changes, for Geelong's round 13 game against Collingwood at Victoria Park, which they won by six points. His brother, Bernard Toohey, missed the game due to suspension.
 
He later played in the South Australian National Football League, for West Torrens and then West Adelaide.

References

1966 births
Australian rules footballers from New South Wales
Geelong Football Club players
West Adelaide Football Club players
West Torrens Football Club players
Living people